John Liddell Kelly (19 February 1850 – 10 December 1925) was a British journalist and poet.

Biography
Born near Airdrie, Scotland, Kelly left school at the age of eleven and was self-educated afterwards. He married in 1870 and emigrated to New Zealand in 1880 on account of his health. In New Zealand he served as sub-editor for the Auckland Star and wrote humorous verses for the Auckland Observer. He also worked for the Lyttelton Times and the New Zealand Times.

Works
 (1885). Tahiti, the Land of Love and Beauty.
 (1887). Tarawera, or the Curse of Tuhoto.
 (1890). Zealandia's Jubilee.
 (1902). Heather and Fern.

References

External links
 

19th-century British journalists
British male journalists
19th-century British poets
1850 births
1925 deaths
New Zealand journalists
New Zealand poets
New Zealand male writers
British male poets
19th-century British male writers
People from Airdrie, North Lanarkshire
Scottish emigrants to New Zealand